Vladimir III may refer to:

 Vladimir III Mstislavich (1132–1173), prince of Kiev in 1171
 Vladimir III Svyatoslavich (after 1143 – 1200), prince of Novgorod
 Vladimir III Igorevich (1170–1211), prince of Galicia